Curlew Lake State Park is a public recreation area located on the eastern shore of Curlew Lake  northeast of Republic in Ferry County, Washington. The state park's  include facilities for picnicking, camping, hiking, biking, boating, fishing, and swimming.

References

External links
Curlew Lake State Park Washington State Parks and Recreation Commission 
Curlew Lake State Park Map Washington State Parks and Recreation Commission

State parks of Washington (state)
Parks in Ferry County, Washington